The Kentucky cave shrimp (Palaemonias ganteri) is an eyeless, troglobite shrimp. It lives in caves in Barren County, Edmonson County, Hart County and Warren County, Kentucky. The shrimp's shell has no pigment; the species is nearly transparent and closely resembles its nearest relative, the Alabama cave shrimp.

The habitat of the Kentucky cave shrimp is exclusively in underground streams of caves. It is endemic to the Mammoth Cave National Park region of central Kentucky. The shrimp feeds mainly on sediments that are washed into the cave by the movement of groundwater.

Conservation

The Kentucky cave shrimp was registered as an endangered species under the Endangered Species Act in 1983, and was included on the IUCN Red List as Endangered in 1994. There are currently only several thousand remaining. It is mostly threatened by contaminated groundwater running into its habitat. Several nearby communities either have inadequate sewage treatment facilities or lack such facilities altogether. An additional potential threat is the entry of contaminants from traffic accidents and roadside businesses. One incident in 1979 caused the death of aquatic cave organisms in a part of the Mammoth Cave system, and in a 1980 incident, a truck carrying toxic cyanide salts overturned on Interstate 65, just south of Mammoth Cave National Park.

A recovery plan is underway  which includes:
 Surveying the location and extent of all areas supporting shrimp
 Conducting life history and other research required to determine what constitutes a viable population
 Monitoring population status
 Maintaining adequate water quality; 
 Protecting the shrimp from introduced predators
 Producing and conducting public education programs.

References

Atyidae
Crustaceans of the United States
Cave shrimp
Endemic fauna of Kentucky
Freshwater crustaceans of North America
Mammoth Cave National Park
Crustaceans described in 1901
Taxa named by William Perry Hay
ESA endangered species